The 2024 Delaware gubernatorial election will be held on November 5, 2024, to elect the governor of the U.S. state of Delaware, concurrently with the 2024 U.S. presidential election, as well as elections to the United States Senate, elections to the United States House of Representatives, and various state and local elections. Incumbent Democratic Governor John Carney is term-limited and cannot seek re-election to a third term in office.

Democratic primary

Candidates

Publicly expressed interest
 Matt Meyer, New Castle County Executive

Potential
 Lisa Blunt Rochester, U.S. Representative for Delaware's at-large congressional district
 Bethany Hall-Long, Lieutenant Governor of Delaware
 Kathy Jennings, Attorney General of Delaware

General election

Predictions

Notes

References

2024
Governor
Delaware